POV is the ninth and final studio album by the rock group Utopia, released in 1985. It peaked at #161 on the Billboard 200 charts. Except for a live 1992 reunion album (and compilations), this was the last album released by Utopia, and Rundgren's final studio work under the Utopia banner.

The ambiguous acronymic title is given four possible explanations on the back cover of the album, standing variously for "Price of Victory", "Pillar of Virtue", "Point of View" or "Persistence of Vision". The front cover photo depicts the band dressed in quasi-military costumes and looking at a star map, while in the background the giant "Pharaoh" mask (a stage prop from their 1977-1978 Ra tour) can be seen. The album layout also reflects Rundgren's interest in computers and information technology and incorporates elements adapted from the 'window' design used in the Apple Macintosh operating system of the mid-1980s. The music continues in the contemporary pop vein of the previous album, with elements of new wave music and electronic experimental music as well.

Track listing

Personnel
Todd Rundgren – vocals, guitar
Kasim Sulton – vocals, bass guitar
Roger Powell – vocals, keyboards
John "Willie" Wilcox – vocals, drums

Charts
Album – Billboard

References

1985 albums
Todd Rundgren albums
Utopia (band) albums
Albums produced by Todd Rundgren
Passport Records albums